The 2019 North Norfolk District Council election took place on 2 May 2019 to elect members of North Norfolk District Council in England. This was on the same day as other local elections. The whole council was up for election on new boundaries and the number of seats was reduced by 8. The Liberal Democrats gained control of the council.

Election result

|}

Ward results

Bacton

Beeston Regis and The Runtons

Briston

Coastal

Cromer Town

Erpingham

Gresham

Happisburgh

Hickling

Holt

Hoveton and Tunstead

Lancaster North

Lancaster South

Mundesley

North Waltham East

North Walsham Market Cross

North Waltham West

Poppyland

Priory

Roughton

Sheringham North

Sheringham South

St Benet

Stalham

Stibbard

Stody

Suffield Park

The Raynhams

Trunch

Walsingham

Wells with Holkham

Worstead

By-elections

Coastal

A by-election was held after the resignation of Karen Ward.

Holt

A by-election was held after the resignation of Duncan Baker.

Stalham

A by-election was held after the resignation of Marion Millership.

References 

2019 English local elections
May 2019 events in the United Kingdom
2019
2010s in Norfolk